Carlos Gorozabel (born 8 October 1956) is an Ecuadorian footballer. He played in three matches for the Ecuador national football team in 1983. He was also part of Ecuador's squad for the 1983 Copa América tournament.

References

1956 births
Living people
Ecuadorian footballers
Ecuador international footballers
Association football midfielders
People from Portoviejo